Bidya Sinha Saha Mim is a Bangladeshi actress and model. She made her debut in 2008 appearing in Amar Ache Jol directed by Humayun Ahmed and produced by Impress Telefilm Limited.

Career
Mim participated in Lux Channel I Superstar in 2007. She was the winner of the contest.

Later she worked Tollywood with director Raja Chanda.

Filmography

Television

Web series

Short films

TV commercials

Awards and nominations
 Lux Channel I Superstar 2007 winner

Bibliography
 Shraboner Brishti Te Bheja (2012)
 Purnota (2013)

See also
 Cinema of Bangladesh

References

External links

Further reading
 

Living people
1992 births
People from Comilla District
Bangladeshi Hindus
Bangladeshi film actresses
Bangladeshi television actresses
Bengali television actresses
Actresses in Bengali cinema
Bangladeshi expatriate actresses in India
Bangladeshi female models
Best Actress National Film Awards (Bangladesh) winners
Comilla Victoria Government College alumni
Best Actress Bachsas Award winners
21st-century Bangladeshi actresses